Joan Wake CBE (29 February 1884 – 15 January 1974) is best known as a historian who led a successful campaign to save Delapré Abbey from destruction.

Background
Joan Wake was born at Courteenhall, a daughter of Sir Hereward Wake, the 12th baronet, and his wife Catherine St Aubyn.

Historian and activist
Whilst studying at the London School of Economics and Political Science, she developed contacts with the historians Eileen Power, Frank Stenton and Doris Mary Stenton. Her own earliest major historical project was the full transcription of hundreds of medieval charters in the Hesketh Collection at Easton Neston.

In 1918, she became a Fellow of the Royal Historical Society, and two years later was one of the founders of the Northamptonshire Record Society. Her activities during the rest of her life focused on promoting the preservation, safe custody and publication of the records of Northamptonshire. She was also active in the British Records Association, founded in 1932.

As well as the research and writing activities usually associated with historians, she was an activist who visited 36 solicitors' firms during the Second World War to ensure that archives in their care were not destroyed as part of the wartime paper salvage campaign.

By the 1950s, Delapré Abbey, a short distance south of the centre of Northampton, was owned by Northampton Corporation, disused and under threat of demolition. Through successful fundraising and political pressure, Joan Wake and the Record Society brought about a change of policy so that the building was saved; in 1959 it was officially opened as the Northamptonshire Record Office with accommodation for the Record Society’s library. In the following year, she was made a C.B.E. in recognition of her achievements.

Publications
Between 1911 and 1973, a total of over 80 works by Joan Wake were published, the majority of which related to various aspects of the history of Northamptonshire.

As General Editor of the volumes of historical texts published by the Northamptonshire Record Society from 1924 to 1964, she composed prefaces or indexes to eight volumes. She had difficulty in carrying out this work on account of the copious quantities of face powder she applied whilst wearing her glasses.

Death and burial
Wake died on 15 January 1974, and is buried at Courteenhall church.

References

Further reading

1884 births
1974 deaths
People from West Northamptonshire District
Fellows of the Royal Historical Society
Commanders of the Order of the British Empire
20th-century English historians
British women historians
20th-century British women writers
Daughters of baronets